Grimstone is a surname. Notable people with the surname include:

Ernest Grimstone (1883–1933), Australian politician
Gerry Grimstone (born 1949), British businessman
Mary Grimstone (1796–1869), British poet and writer